Xzavion Rashan Curry (born July 27, 1998) is an American professional baseball pitcher for the Cleveland Guardians of Major League Baseball (MLB). He made his MLB debut in 2022.

Amateur career
Curry attended Benjamin Elijah Mays High School in Atlanta, Georgia and Georgia Tech, where he played college baseball for the Georgia Tech Yellow Jackets. During the summer of 2018, he played collegiate summer baseball with the Harwich Mariners of the Cape Cod Baseball League. In 2019, his junior year at Georgia Tech, Curry pitched  innings and went 4–2 with a 4.08 earned run average (ERA) and 66 strikeouts.

Professional career
After his junior year, the Cleveland Guardians selected Curry in the seventh round of the 2019 Major League Baseball draft. He signed with the Guardians, but did not play after signing and also did not play in 2020 after the minor league season was cancelled due to the COVID-19 pandemic. He made his professional debut in 2021 with the Lynchburg Hillcats of the Low-A East and was promoted to the Lake County Captains of the High-A Central and the Akron RubberDucks of the Double-A Northeast during the season. Over 19 starts between the three clubs, Curry went 8–1 with a 2.30 ERA and 123 strikeouts over  innings. His ERA was sixth lowest in the minor leagues. He returned to Akron to begin the 2022 season and was promoted to the Columbus Clippers of the Triple-A International League in late June.

On August 14, 2022, Guardians manager Terry Francona announced that Curry would be promoted to the major leagues the next day to make his MLB debut as the starting pitcher in the second game of a double header versus the Detroit Tigers at Progressive Field. He debuted wearing number 71, which hadn't been worn by a Guardians player since Johnny Hodapp in 1929, the first year players wore jersey numbers. He pitched five innings and gave up eight hits, three earned runs, and one walk while striking out three in a 7–5 loss.

References

External links

Georgia Tech Yellow Jackets bio

1998 births
Living people
Baseball players from Atlanta
Major League Baseball pitchers
Cleveland Guardians players
Georgia Tech Yellow Jackets baseball players
Harwich Mariners players
Lynchburg Hillcats players
Lake County Captains players
Akron RubberDucks players
Columbus Clippers players
African-American baseball players